Alija del Infantado is a municipality which is part of Tierra de La Bañeza comarca, autonomous community of Castile and León, Spain.

Villages 
 Alija del Infantado
 Bécares
 Navianos
 La Nora
 Ozaniego

See also 
 Tierra de La Bañeza

References

Municipalities in the Province of León
Tierra de La Bañeza